Tory Tunnell is an American producer who runs Safehouse Pictures with her producing partner, Joby Harold. The company was co-founded in 2005. The duo currently have an overhead tv deal with Legendary TV and Amazon Prime for features.

Career 
Tunnell's latest projects are the upcoming films Space Mountain and Atlas starring Jennifer Lopez, Simu Liu, and Sterling K. Brown both of which she will be producing alongside Harold. She is also working on the new Untitled Godzilla Project with Legendary starring Kurt Russell, Wyatt Russell, Ren Watabe, Anna Sawai, and Kiersey Clemons. Tunnell is developing the movie I.F. with Mike Mitchell attached to direct and Tiffany Haddish set to star.

Tunnell and Harold have made films in a variety of genres.   From Guy Ritchie’s King Arthur: Legend of the Sword starring Charlie Hunnam and Jude Law to the breakout comedy of SXSW My Blind Brother starring Adam Scott, Nick Kroll, and Jenny Slate to the critical hit tv show, Underground about slaves escaping the south, to the ice skating drama Spinning Out on Netflix starring Kaya Scodelario and January Jones and Johnny Weir,  the company has shown an agile ability to produce a wide range of content .  Harold and Tunnell have a number of films in development including Liberators with Michael B. Jordan attached to star at Warner Bros, Battle of Britain that Ridley Scott is attached to direct for Fox, Wink that is loosely based on Tunnell’s own experiences of online dating as her mother, Patricia Arquette’s directorial debut and true story drama Love Canal, limited series Mary’s Mosaic to be written by Oscar winning writer David Seidler for Warner Bros, among others.

Originally based in New York, Tunnell began her career producing independent features including; Holy Rollers starring Jesse Eisenberg and Justin Bartha which premiered at Sundance 2009; Trumbo starring Liam Neeson, Michael Douglas, Joan Allen, Nathan Lane, and Donald Sutherland, which premiered at the Toronto Film Festival 2007; and Awake written and directed by Joby Harold starring Jessica Alba, Hayden Christensen, and Terrence Howard.

Personal life 
Tunnell graduated Phi Beta Kappa from Johns Hopkins University and now resides with Harold and their 3 children.

Filmography

References

Living people
American film producers
Year of birth missing (living people)